Another State of Grace is the fourth studio album by hard rock band Black Star Riders, released on September 6, 2019. Black Star Riders evolved from the touring version of Thin Lizzy, assembled by guitarist Scott Gorham after the death of Thin Lizzy's leader Phil Lynott. The band's first three albums, All Hell Breaks Loose, The Killer Instinct, and Heavy Fire, were released in 2013, 2015, and 2017 respectively.

It is the first Black Star Riders album to feature new guitarist/songwriter Christian Martucci, the only one to feature drummer Chad Szeliga, and the final one to feature founding guitarist Scott Gorham, who announced his departure from the group on September 20, 2021.

Upon its release, the album reached number one in the UK Rock & Metal Albums Chart.

Recording
After working with producer Nick Raskulinecz on their previous two albums, Another State of Grace was produced by Jay Ruston, who had mixed the previous two albums. Gorham welcomed Ruston as producer: "It was the best decision we’ve ever made as a band... You know he’s pushing you, but he does it in such a way that you really don’t mind and you want to play better for him."

Track listing

Personnel
Ricky Warwick – lead vocals, rhythm guitar
Scott Gorham – lead and rhythm guitar
Christian Martucci – lead and rhythm guitar, backing vocals
Robbie Crane – bass guitar
Chad Szeliga – drums

Michael Monroe – saxophone on track 1
Pearl Aday – vocals on track 8

Charts

References

2019 albums
Black Star Riders albums
Nuclear Blast albums